Simhapuri may also refer to:

Simhapuri Express, an express train run by Indian Railways between Nellore and Secunderabad
Vikrama Simhapuri University, a university in Nellore
Simhapuri Simham, a 1983 Telugu film starring Chiranjeevi